Kragon is an unincorporated community in Breathitt County, Kentucky, United States.

The town was named after K. Ragon, who established a factory there in 1913.

References

Unincorporated communities in Breathitt County, Kentucky
Unincorporated communities in Kentucky